Tessarecphora arachnoides is a species of beetle in the family Cerambycidae, and the only species in the genus Tessarecphora. It was described by Thomson in 1857.

References

Compsosomatini
Beetles described in 1857
Monotypic beetle genera